() or  is a coastal town and municipality in the comarca of Marina Alta, in the province of Alicante, Valencia, Spain, by the Mediterranean Sea. Situated on the side of the Montgó Massif, behind a wide bay and sheltered between two rocky headlands, the town has become a very popular small seaside resort and market town. Half of its resident population and over two thirds of its annual visitors are foreigners.

History
The area was first inhabited in prehistoric times, 30,000 years ago by cave dwellers on Montgó. Subsequent residents have included Stone and Bronze-age peoples, Romans, Greeks, Phoenicians, Visigoths, Germanic, Carthaginians, and Moors. Roman fishing boats used the port, and there is evidence that dates the Roman occupation of Xàbia to the 2nd century BC, it makes Xàbia the oldest known Roman site on the coast with a commercial port for fish and minerals.

In the 6th century AD, Christian Visigoth monks came to Xàbia and founded the monastery of Sant Martí, which likely gave its name to the cape in the area named Cap San Martí. Hermenegild, son of the Visigoth king Leovigild of Toledo, sought refuge in the Monastery after angering his father by marrying a Christian girl. When his father's troops arrived to arrest him all but one monk fled to Portichol; Hermenegild and the old monk were killed. Several people with Visigoth names still live in the area.
	
There is little left of the Moors and their culture, other than some inscribed gravestones and ceramics.  They had controlled the area from about 714 AD until they (the Moriscos) were finally expelled from the Alicante region in 1609. The hermitage of Popol dates to the 14th century.

In the 16th and 17th centuries pirate raids were prevalent, so a wall was built around the town for protection. The wall was later torn down, and today a replica exists in its place in certain sections.

Archaeology 
In September 2021, archaeologists announced the discovery of trove of 1,500-year-old gold coins from the Roman Empire. A hoard of 50 coins with inscriptions was almost well-preserved and easily readable. According to researchers, Roman Emperors' pictures included Valentinian I (three coins), Valentinian II (seven coins), Theodosius I (15 coins), Arcadius (17 coins), Honorius (10 coins) and an unidentified coin were depicted on the coins.

Geography
Xàbia is situated in the north of the province, on the easternmost point of the Mediterranean coast. Flat, fertile agricultural land stretches for miles inland, criss-crossed by small streams and used primarily for growing citrus and olive trees. The coastline of Xàbia features four capes; Cabo de San Antonio, Cap de la Nau (the largest), Cap Negre and Cap Martí.
	
The Montgó Massif, which shelters Xàbia, is the highest summit of the region standing at a height of over 750m. The Parque natural del Macizo del Montgó was declared in 1987, stretching across the area of La Plana to the cape of Sant Antoni. Cape San Antonio is located nearby.

Transport
The port has a gravel beach and marina, known as Duanes de la Mar. Whilst the history of the harbour stretches back to the 15th century, the first jetty was built in 1871 and it became an important gateway for the export of raisins. The raisin trade collapsed at the end of the 19th century, and the settlement became only a fishing harbour. The modern harbour was built in the 1950s and 1960s. The nautical club has been in the central area of the harbour since 1963. The landmark is the church of Mare de Déu de Loreto, built in 1967 in the shape of an oval boat keel, to resemble a fishing vessel bursting through the waves.

Notable people
David Ferrer (born 1982), tennis player
Sergio Hernández (born 1983), racing car driver
Tomàs Morató i Bernabéu (1887–1965), politician
Adrián Ortolá (born 1993), footballer
Xavi Torres (born 1986), footballer
Cristóbal Balenciaga (1895-1972), fashion designer

References

External links

Official Xàbia website 
English News and Features about Jávea (English)

Municipalities in the Province of Alicante
Seaside resorts in Spain